Mount Kikizi is one of the highest mountains in Burundi. Its summit is at a height of 2,145 m (7,038 ft). The mountain stands in the country's southeast, between the towns of Rutana and Kinyinya.

A spring emanating from Mount Kikizi, the Ruvyironza, was identified by Burkhart Waldecker as being the source of the White Nile.

References

Kikizi